Live in Japan is the second live album from American rock band The Runaways, released on 13 August 1977. The album was originally released only in Japan (their only major fan base), and some other regions including Canada, Australia, New Zealand and the Netherlands. It was the last Runaways album Cherie Currie and Jackie Fox appeared on and not intended for release in the United States or the United Kingdom.

Track listing

Album Charts

Personnel
The Runaways
 Cherie Currie – lead vocals
 Joan Jett – rhythm guitar, lead vocals
 Lita Ford – lead guitar, backing vocals
 Jackie Fox – bass, backing vocals
 Sandy West – drums, backing vocals, lead vocals on "Wild Thing"

Inlet prints and thanks 
The Runaways would like to thank Udo Artists inc.
and Nippon Phonogram for making their first tour
of Japan incredible. Also thanks to

An on the road production for kim Fowley,
Produced by KENT J. SMYTHE AND THE RUNAWAYS
Runaways Fan Club 6000 Sunset Boulevard, Hollywood California 90028 U.S.A.
P.S. Send us your picture so we can see who you are         - The Runaways

Recorded at the Tokyo Koseinenkin Kaikan
and the Shibuya Kokaido 5 / 6 / 12 Jun 1977
Mixed at Onkio-Haus-Studio 18 / 19 Jun 1977
Mixed by Kent J. Smythe & Takashi Kitazawa
Engineer : Toshio Kobayashi

Photography : Akiyoshi Miyashita
      Weekly Heibon
      Eiichiro Sakata-Apache
Design : Masao Ohogiya

Special thanks to :
Mr. UDO and A. TERABAYASHI, Hiro Nakamura, Big Mac Imamura
The initial Japanese vinyl LP edition had a 'gate-fold cover', and included 12" x 12" (30 cm x 30 cm) photos of all five band members, with brief bio-notes on the back (the printing is of hand written data by the band member whose photo is on the front), plus a booklet with the song lyrics printed in both English and Japanese.  The initial French editions also had a gate-fold cover and included the photos, but not the lyrics.  The Canadian version did have the gate-fold cover, but didn't include either the photos or the lyric inserts.  The album was never released in the United States.  A 2004 Compact Disc version was issued by Cherry Red UK, after Phonogram dropped the album from its catalogues.

Mercury|Polygram Catalog references 
[1977]   Japan    (Mercury|Polygram): RJ-7249
[1977]   Canada   (Mercury|Phonogram): SRM-1-3740
[1977]   France   (SACEM):  9100 046
[2004]   Cherry Red UK : 241 -- (U.S. Distributor: MSI Music Distribution)
[2019]   USA  (Culture Factory|Mercury|Universal Music Special Markets): B0031054-01 (Special release of 1200 LPs for Record Store Day Black Friday 2019)

References

The Runaways albums
1977 live albums
Mercury Records live albums